The 2018 Women's EuroHockey Indoor Nations Championship was the 19th edition of the tournament. It took place from 19 to 21 January 2018 in Prague, Czech Republic.

Teams

Umpires

 Frances Block (ENG)
 Celine Martin-Schmets (UKR)
 Xenia Ulrich (NED)
 Anastasia Bogolyubova (RUS)
 Tara Browne (IRL)
 Sviatlana Karzhevich (BLR)
 Daniela Kavanova (CZE)
 Olena Klymenko (UKR)
 Alwiene Sterk (NED)
 Sandra Wagner (GER)

Results
All times are local (UTC+1).

Preliminary round

Pool A

Pool B

Second round

Pool C
The result between the teams from the same preliminary round pool were carried over.

Knockout stage

Semifinals

Third place game

Final

Final ranking

References

Women's EuroHockey Indoor Championship
EuroHockey Indoor Championship, 2018
EuroHockey Indoor Championship
EuroHockey Indoor Championship
Women's EuroHockey Indoor Championship, 2018
EuroHockey Indoor Championship Women
Women's EuroHockey Indoor Championship, 2018
Women 1